Ángel Cabrera (born 12 September 1969) is an Argentine professional golfer who has played on both the European Tour and PGA Tour. He is known affectionately as "El Pato" in Spanish ("The Duck") for his waddling gait. He is a two-time major champion, with wins at the U.S. Open in 2007 and the Masters in 2009; he was the first (and still only as of 2021) Argentine and South American to win either. He also lost in a sudden death playoff at the Masters in 2013.

Background and personal life
Born in Córdoba, Argentina, Cabrera's father, Miguel, was a handyman, and his mother worked as a maid. He was three or four when his parents split up and was left in the care of his paternal grandmother. Cabrera stayed with her until he was 16, when he moved in a few feet away, to the house of Silvia, twelve years his senior, and a mother of four boys. They had a son, Federico, followed by another, Ángel.

When Cabrera was 10, he became a caddy at the Córdoba Country Club, which he says almost became his home. He learned golf playing against other caddies for money. His fierce determination and powerful swing soon caught the eye of members, one of whom, Juan Cruz Molina, a local real estate magnate, bought him his first set of clubs when he was 16.

With his stocky figure and habit of smoking at every hole, Cabrera cut a distinctive figure on the course. He is also acknowledged as having one of the biggest swings in the game. His son Federico became a professional golfer in 2008 and entered the PGA Tour's qualifying school in 2011, but was eliminated in the second stage. His other son, Ángel, became a professional in 2012 and joined the Canadian Tour. The elder Ángel and his sons also compete on PGA Tour Latinoamérica.

In January 2021, Cabrera was arrested in Rio de Janeiro as a result of Interpol issuing a red notice due to him having left Argentina without authorization following the start of a trial where he was facing a number of criminal charges, including assault, theft and illegal intimidation. He remained in a Brazilian prison until June 2021, when his extradition to Argentina was completed. In July 2021, he was convicted and sentenced to two years in prison. In November 2022, he was convicted of a second assault and sentenced to an additional two years and four months in prison.

Professional career

Early career
Cabrera turned professional at age twenty and his first three visits to the European Tour Qualifying School were unsuccessful. On his fourth trip in 1995, made with Molina's financial assistance, he qualified for membership of the European Tour in 1996. Cabrera retained his card comfortably in his first three seasons and improved substantially to tenth on the Order of Merit in 1999. He has since finished in the top 15 of the Order of Merit on seven occasions, with a best placing of fifth in 2005.

European Tour wins
Cabrera's first European Tour win was the 2001 Argentine Open, which was sanctioned by the European Tour on a one-time basis that year. In 2005, he won the BMW Championship, the most prestigious event on the European Tour outside the majors and the World Golf Championships. However, it was only his third European Tour win, a tally which was perhaps disappointing given his consistent form on the tour. At that point, Cabrera had also won seven non-European Tour events in Latin America, where the standard of play is much lower than on the European Tour.

Cabrera featured a highest of 9th in the Official World Golf Ranking on 2 October 2005. He was the top-ranked Latin American player for a number of years before the emerging pair of Andrés Romero and Camilo Villegas won PGA Tour tournaments in 2008. Cabrera earned enough money ($623,504) on the PGA Tour in 2006 playing as a non-member to earn a tour card for 2007. He has played almost full-time in 2007, 2008, and 2009.

In 2009, Cabrera announced partnership with Gary Player Design to collaborate on a golf course design business with a focus in Latin America. This coincides with golf, the Olympics and Brazil coming together in 2016.

2007 U.S. Open win
Cabrera won his first major championship at the 2007 U.S. Open at Oakmont near Pittsburgh. He finished the tournament at 5-over, topping runners-up Tiger Woods and Jim Furyk by one stroke. Cabrera entered the third round as the leader at even par, after finishing the first round at 1-under, and shooting 1-over on the second day. He struggled during the third round, finishing 6 strokes over par, putting him 4 strokes behind Aaron Baddeley and two behind Woods. Cabrera rebounded and came back strong on the last day. He birdied one of the longest par-3 holes in major championship history when he sunk a  putt at the 8th hole, which played at a lengthy  on Sunday. Cabrera finished one stroke under par, bringing him down to 5-over (285) for the championship, just enough to secure his first career major victory. At a post-round interview Cabrera said "Well, there are some players that have psychologists, some have sportologists, I smoke."

Cabrera became the first Argentine player to win the U.S. Open and the second to win a major, joining Roberto De Vicenzo, who won the British Open in 1967 at Royal Liverpool (Hoylake). Cabrera received the 2007 Olimpia de Oro ("Golden Olympia") as Argentina's sportsperson of the year.

2009 Masters win
Cabrera won the Masters Tournament in 2009 in a three-way sudden-death playoff, seeing off Chad Campbell after the first playoff hole, and defeating Kenny Perry on the second. On the first playoff hole, the 18th, Cabrera missed right of the fairway, leaving his ball stymied directly behind a tree. On his second shot, he hit a shot right of the tree that would have sent the golf ball onto the 10th hole fairway, but ended up hitting another tree about  ahead, bouncing left and settling in the center of the 18th fairway. He and Perry both got up-and-down for par, while Campbell missed his  par putt and was eliminated. On the second playoff hole, the 10th, Cabrera made par to defeat Perry, becoming the first Argentine to win the Masters. He was the lowest-ranked golfer to win the Masters, having been ranked 69th before the tournament.

2011
In 2011, Cabrera was in the mix to win a second Green Jacket at Augusta when he was in the final pairing on Sunday, four strokes behind leader Rory McIlroy. Cabrera was tied for the lead at one point during the afternoon, but bogeys on 12 and 16 derailed his chances. He posted a final round 71 which placed him in sole seventh, five strokes behind the South African Charl Schwartzel. This was however Cabrera's best finish in a major tournament since his win back in 2009. He missed the cut in the years other three major championships and failed to qualify for the season ending FedEx Cup playoffs, finishing 154th in the standings. His best finish of the season was a T6 in the fall season at the McGladrey Classic.

2013
At the Masters in 2013, Cabrera was again in the final pairing on Sunday. After taking a two shot lead on the front nine, Cabrera proceeded to lose the lead and after failing to birdie the par-5 15th and was two shots behind leader Jason Day. Day then bogeyed two holes in succession and when Cabrera made a 20-foot putt for birdie at the 16th he tied Adam Scott and Day briefly for the lead. As Cabrera stood on the 18th fairway, up ahead on the green and playing in the penultimate group, Scott holed a birdie putt to take the lead. On the first playoff hole, Scott's second shot was  out, but rolled back off the front of the green. Cabrera's second shot also came up short, rolling back off the green and coming to rest behind Scott's ball. Cabrera's chip just slid by the hole. Both players then made par sending them onto the 10th for the second playoff hole. Scott and Cabrera hit their tee shots in the fairway and matched each other with approach shots which landed on the green giving both birdie chances, Cabrera with  uphill and Scott a downhill right to left 12 footer. Cabrera's putt was a turn away from dropping in, giving Scott a chance to win with his putt. Scott made the putt defeating Cabrera and bringing Australia their first ever green jacket.

Although Cabrera was fully exempt on the PGA Tour, he occasionally competed in Argentinian events on PGA Tour Latinoamérica, a developmental tour in Latin America whose 2013 members included former PGA Tour winners Carlos Franco and Ted Purdy. Cabrera won the 2012 Visa Open de Argentina and the 2013 Abierto del Centro.

2014
Cabrera won the Greenbrier Classic in West Virginia on 6 July 2014, his first PGA Tour victory since claiming the green jacket in 2009. It was his third win in the United States, but his first non-major win on the PGA Tour. Cabrera shot a six-under-par 64 on both Saturday and Sunday to secure the title, winning $1.17 million

2015
Cabrera finished in the top-25 only twice and wound up 170th on the PGA Tour's money list.

Team golf career
Cabrera was a member of the international squad in the Presidents Cup in 2005, 2007, 2009, and 2013.

Professional wins (53)

PGA Tour wins (3)

PGA Tour playoff record (1–1)

European Tour wins (5)

1Co-sanctioned by the PGA of Argentina Tour

European Tour playoff record (1–2)

Asian Tour wins (1)

PGA Tour Latinoamérica wins (2)

Tour de las Américas wins (7)
1999 Argentine Masters
2001 Argentine Masters
2002 Argentine Open
2005 Argentine Masters
2006 Center Open
2007 Center Open1, Argentine Masters1
1Co-sanctioned by the TPG Tour

TPG Tour wins (4)

Argentine Tour wins (23)
1991 San Diego Grand Prix
1992 Norpatagonico Open
1994 Villa Gessel Grand Prix, South Open, Center Open, Nautico Hacoaj Grand Prix
1995 Abierto del Litoral
1996 South Open, Santiago del Estero Open
1997 Center Open
1998 Argentine PGA Championship
2000 Center Open, Bariloche Match Play, Desafio de Maestros
2001 Center Open, Argentine Open1
2002 Argentine PGA Championship
2004 South Open, North Open
2005 Center Open, North Open, Argentine Masters2
2006 Center Open2
1Co-sanctioned by the European Tour
2Co-sanctioned by the Tour de las Américas

Cordoba Tour wins (6)
2001 (2) Ascochingas Tournament, La Cumbre Tournament
2002 (2) Rio Cuarto Tournament, Las Delicias Tournament
2008 (1) Cordoba PGA Championship
2009 (1) Angel Cabrera Tour 2nd Tournament

Other wins (9)
1995 (2) Paraguay Open, El Rodeo Open (Colombia)
1996 (2) Volvo Masters of Latin America (Brazil), Viña del Mar Open (Chile)
1998 (1) Brazil Open
1999 (1) Brazil Open
2007 (1) PGA Grand Slam of Golf
2009 (1) Gary Player Invitational (with Tony Johnstone)
2017 (1) PNC Father-Son Challenge (with Angel Jr)

Major championships

Wins (2)

1Defeated Kenny Perry and Chad Campbell in a sudden-death playoff: Cabrera (4-4), Perry (4-5) and Campbell (5).

Results timeline

WD = withdrew
CUT = missed the half way cut
"T" indicates a tie for a place.

Summary

Most consecutive cuts made – 7 (2008 PGA – 2010 U.S. Open)
Longest streak of top-10s – 2 (2001 Masters – 2001 U.S. Open)

Results in The Players Championship

CUT = missed the half-way cut
WD = withdrew
"T" indicates a tie for a place.

Results in World Golf Championships

1Cancelled due to 9/11

QF, R16, R32, R64 = Round in which player lost in match play
"T" = tied
NT = No tournament
Note that the HSBC Champions did not become a WGC event until 2009.

Results in senior major championships

"T" indicates a tie for a place
NT = No tournament due to COVID-19 pandemic

Team appearances
Alfred Dunhill Cup (representing Argentina): 1997, 1998, 2000
World Cup (representing Argentina): 1998, 1999, 2000, 2001, 2002, 2003, 2004, 2005, 2006
Presidents Cup (International Team): 2005, 2007, 2009, 2013

References

External links

Angel Cabrera fought his way from the barrio to the U.S. Open

Argentine male golfers
European Tour golfers
PGA Tour golfers
Winners of men's major golf championships
Sportspeople from Córdoba Province, Argentina
People convicted of assault
People convicted of theft
1969 births
Living people